Orangetheory Fitness (OTF) is an American boutique fitness studio franchise based in Boca Raton, Florida. The first studio was established in Fort Lauderdale, Florida in 2010 by founder, Ellen Latham. The classes are one hour long and involve two groups, one on the treadmills and the other group working with weights or on rowers. As of 2023, Orangetheory Fitness has over 1,500 studios throughout 50 US states and 24 countries. Since its founding in 2010, the chain has expanded, surpassing $1 billion in systemwide sales in 2018. As of 2020, the chain has over one million members.

History 
Orangetheory Fitness was founded by exercise physiologist Ellen Latham, Jerome Kern, and David Long in March 2010. It is the successor to a Fort Lauderdale-based Pilates studio, "Ellen's Ultimate Workout", founded by Latham in the late 1990s.

Orangetheory Fitness was ranked #415 in Inc. magazine's "Fastest-Growing Private Companies" list and #255 in Entrepreneur magazine's 2016 "Franchise 500" list of top franchises in the world. Its position on the "Franchise 500" rose to #25 in 2019 and #43 in 2020.

COVID-19 pandemic response 
At the beginning of the COVID-19 pandemic, Orangetheory Fitness attempted to instill precautions to keep their employees and members safe. On March 17, 2020, all corporate-owned studios were closed. Franchisees were encouraged to follow their lead.

Orangetheory Fitness paused all payments on their memberships during this closure. Corporate studios continued to pay their employees throughout this period. Due to their studios being closed, they developed at-home workouts to give members a way to exercise during this time.

During the closure, Orangetheory Fitness' Medical Advisory Board developed a plan for reopening in order to attempt to reduce uncertainty while also keeping staff and members safe. The new policies implemented follow the guidelines created by the Centers for Disease Control and Prevention, which consisted of "temperature checks before entry; reduced class sizes to maintain social distancing; redesigned workouts to minimize equipment cross-contamination; class scheduling modifications to allow for thorough sanitation protocols in between classes; training and implementation of electrostatic cleanings; temporarily closures of showers and towel service; recommended use of face masks by members; and required use personal protective equipment by all staff." Despite reopening their studios, however, the decision was made to continue providing their at-home workouts.

Overview
Orangetheory workouts are a form of high-intensity interval training, alternating between short periods of intense exercise and long recovery periods. These hour-long sessions are designed to generate excess post-exercise oxygen consumption (EPOC). Excess post-exercise oxygen consumption is a physiological concept that occurs after an elevation in oxygen consumption as the body returns to its pre-exercise state. 

Studios are split into three stations: treadmill, water-resistant rowing machines, and weight training. Attendees cycle between these stations over the course of a session. Workouts are categorized as emphasizing endurance, power, or strength, or a combination of the three. Workout sessions are group exercises led by a coach. Classes are pre-designed and not divulged to attendees prior to arrival.

Members can book classes through the Orangetheory app which displays the location, day and time of open classes as well as which coach will be teaching. Members have the option to book classes at any OTF location around the world.

Technology
Heart rate monitors are to be worn around the chest, forearm, or wrist. All metrics are shown on screens within the studio and for updated studios, they are shown on tablets attached to the treadmills or rowers. 

There are five heart rate zones used in the Orangetheory workout; grey, blue, green, orange, and red. 
 The grey zone is 0–60 percent of an attendee's maximum heart-rate and is equivalent to an attendee's resting heart rate. 
 The blue zone is 61–70 percent of an attendee's maximum heart-rate. This is considered a warm-up period. 
 The green zone is 71–83 percent of an attendee's maximum heart-rate. This is considered an aerobic period of exercise. 
 The orange zone is 84–91 percent of an attendee's maximum heart-rate and when an attendee may reach EPOC.  
 The red zone is 92–100 percent of a participant's maximum heart-rate and represents a period of extreme physical exertion by an attendee. 

Each attendee has the option to wear a branded heart rate monitor that is synchronized to a screen displaying performance metrics for the entire class. Attendees are encouraged to accumulate "splat points," which are based on the amount of time spent in the orange and red heart rate zones, in order to achieve the EPOC effect. Statistics are delivered to each member after each workout via email and a mobile app.

OTF recently partnered with InBody to give members the opportunity to see their body composition analysis through the InBody Test.  The test is performed by standing barefoot on the scale while it measures the weight. It then measures limb weight by standing still with arms out at a 45-degree angle while holding scanners. This 15 second test provides the user with a summary of statistics such as their metabolic rate, skeletal muscle mass, body fat percentage, and more. This test gives more information than a normal scale, allowing users to pinpoint areas of improvement. After completing the scan, users are asked to enter their email to get a copy of their in-depth summary.

Social involvement
Orangetheory Fitness hosts several challenges throughout the year, including the Transformation Challenge, Dri-Tri, Marathon, All Out Mayhem, Hell Week, Orange Voyage, Catch Me If You Can, Inferno, Capture the Flag, and 12 Days of Fitness. These challengers offer members themed workouts and apparel such as t-shirts, hats, or socks, for completing so many days of the challenge.

Documentary
Momentum Shift was released October 21, 2019. This short documentary follows founder Ellen Latham's journey to begin Orangetheory Fitness and how the company got to the success level that it has today.

References

American companies established in 2010
Health care companies established in 2010
Health clubs in the United States
Companies based in Fort Lauderdale, Florida
Medical and health organizations based in Florida
2010 establishments in Florida